The Colrain Poetry Manuscript Conference is the only writers' conference focused entirely on book-length poetry manuscripts. Founded by poet Joan Houlihan, the conference is held 9-10 times a year in locations around the United States and consists of book-length and chapbook-length poetry manuscript reviews by editors and publishers from established poetry presses, including Graywolf Press, Four Way Books, Persea Books, Omnidawn, Barrow Street Press and others, along with poets and editors including conference founder Joan Houlihan (Lesley University), Fred Marchant (Suffolk University) and Ellen Doré Watson (Smith College).

See also
List of writers' conferences

References
 Interview, Massachusetts Poetry Festival
 Poets & Writers Magazine, March/April, 2010
 Writer's Digest, December 8, 2008

External links
 Colrain Poetry Manuscript Conference Site
New Pages
AWP Directory of Conferences

American writers' organizations
Writers' conferences